Brandon Sklenar is an American actor best known for his roles in the films Midway, Mapplethorpe, Vice, and 1923.

Early life and education 

Sklenar was born and raised in Northern New Jersey to Bruce Feakins and Francine Sklenar. His mother is of Czechoslovakian descent.

Career 
Sklenar made his professional film debut in the 2011 film Cornered. The following year, he appeared in the television series Dating Rules from My Future Self. He then appeared in the film Chance in 2014, the NBC comedy series Truth Be Told in 2015, the films Hunky Dory and Bella Donna, and the television series Fall into Me in 2016, a lead role in the American-Japanese horror film Temple and the Fox sitcom series New Girl in 2017.

He was then cast as Edward Mapplethorpe in the 2018 biographical drama film Mapplethorpe, which follows the life of New York photographer Robert Mapplethorpe. It screened at Tribeca Film Festival in 2018 where it was named a Runner-up in the U.S. Narrative Competition section. Sklenar received positive critical acclaim from multiple media outlets for his performance in Mapplethorpe, including from Boy Culture who praised him for "[having] maximum impact in [his] psychologically charged scenes with [Matt] Smith"  He appeared in the 2018 biographical drama film Vice, opposite Amy Adams, Steve Carell, Christian Bale and Sam Rockwell. The film explores the life of politician Dick Cheney and is directed by Academy Award-winner Adam McKay. Sklenar then appeared in Amir Naderi's film Magic Lantern, in addition to films The Last Room and Glass Jaw. In June 2018, Sklenar was also cast in the independent drama film Indigo Valley, which is based on director Jaclyn's Bethany's short film of the same name. That same year, Sklenar was cast as the lead antagonist in The Big Ugly, a noir crime thriller that weaves the British gangster genre with the American western, opposite Ron Perlman, Malcolm McDowell, Nicholas Braun and Leven Rambin. For his work in the film as Junior Lawford, Sklenar received wide critical praise. Richard Roeper of the Chicago Sun Times stated, "Brandon Sklenar gives a screen-popping performance as Junior; he’s fantastic as a monster cloaked in a James Dean persona."

Sklenar then went on to appear in Roland Emmerich’s Midway for Lionsgate with Woody Harrelson, Luke Evans, and Patrick Wilson. Sklenar portrayed George H. Gay Jr., who was the sole survivor of the 30 aircrew that participated in the pivotal Battle of Midway during WW2.

He then starred in the independent film Jonesin’ - a crime comedy about a moonshiner who, after a case of mistaken identity, gets abducted and finds himself stuck in the city between two rival gangs.

In early 2020, he was cast in the lead role of the independent film Futra Days opposite Tania Raymonde and Rosanna Arquette. The film is about a man traveling to the future and exploring the nature of control. For his role he received the Best Actor award at Vienna Independent Film Festival in 2022. In March of 2021, he joined the cast of the film Karen opposite Taryn Manning and Cory Hardrict.

Filmography

Film

Television

References

External links 
 

American male film actors
American male television actors
American people of Italian descent
Male actors from New Jersey
Living people
21st-century American male actors
Year of birth missing (living people)